Vitaly Olegovich Zotov (Зотов Виталий Олегович; born 1 April 1992) is a Russian ice hockey defenceman. He is currently playing with Rubin Tyumen of the Supreme Hockey League (VHL).

Zotov previously played in the Kontinental Hockey League for Lokomotiv Yaroslavl in the 2013–14 season and Metallurg Novokuznetsk in the 2014–15 season. In May 2022, he signed a contract with HC Metallurg from Zhlobin (Belarus).

References

External links

1992 births
Living people
Buran Voronezh players
Dizel Penza players
Lokomotiv Yaroslavl players
Metallurg Novokuznetsk players
Rubin Tyumen players
Russian ice hockey defencemen
PSK Sakhalin players
Ice hockey people from Saint Petersburg